Sylvester, or the Wicked Uncle is a Regency romance novel by Georgette Heyer. First published by Heinemann, London and Putnam, New York in 1957, it is the story of intelligent and desperate Phoebe who ends up marrying the man she has run away from home to avoid, and whom she has caricatured as the villain in her novel. The book features gentle mockery of the Gothic novel genre and also features Heyer's characteristic strong heroine, with a desire for independence (in Phoebe's case, as a writer), who marries on her own terms. The story is set in 1817-1818.

Plot summary

Sylvester, the wealthy Duke of Salford, is considering marriage. He travels to London to discuss the matter with his godmother, Lady Ingham, who tells him of her granddaughter, Phoebe. He departs for a hunt in the countryside and meets Phoebe and her father. Terrified of being made to marry Sylvester and getting no sympathy from her father, Phoebe calls upon a childhood friend, Tom Orde, to help her run away to live with her grandmother, Lady Ingham, in London.  Phoebe is unaware that Lady Ingham is the person who suggested Sylvester marry her.

Phoebe meets Lady Ianthe, the silly widow of Sylvester's twin brother, who is convinced that Sylvester is evil because he is executing his brother's will exactly: her young son, Edmund, must live with Sylvester at the family home of Chance. Phoebe is struck by the parallels between the real Sylvester and the arrogant parody of him in a book which she has written and which is about to be published.  She attempts to change her manuscript, but her publishers say that it is too late to do so. When her novel The Lost Heir is published, it fascinates London because of the perfect satirization of the members of high society.

Sylvester, having decided to scotch the rumour, is so hurt by Phoebe's portrayal of him that he insults Phoebe in public, which causes a scandal and confirms Phoebe as the author. Lady Ingham decides to take Phoebe away to France with Tom Orde as their escort. Unfortunately, Lady Ianthe and her new husband, foppish Sir Nugent Fotherby, are going to France on their honeymoon with Edmund, her son, from the same port. Lady Ianthe has got the idea of taking Edmund away to France from a plot in Phoebe's novel.

Phoebe tries to intervene and boards the schooner with Tom where they are 'kidnapped' by Fotherby, who orders the skipper to set sail.  Edmund is sea-sick and Lady Ianthe is ill so Phoebe and Tom take over the care of the small child.  Phoebe writes to Lady Ingham and Sylvester from France, but Sylvester catches up with them before he receives the letter.  At first he is overjoyed to see Phoebe but then blames her for helping Lady Ianthe to kidnap Edmund. However, Sylvester needs Phoebe to look after Edmund on the journey back to England.
 
Sylvester complains of all the scrapes which Phoebe has embroiled him in and, in turn, Phoebe accuses Sylvester of ruining her reputation. Sylvester, having realised that he loves Phoebe, clumsily proposes marriage but Phoebe is outraged by the perceived sarcasm. Sylvester runs to his mother for help. She arranges to meet Phoebe to explain that Sylvester's arrogance has arisen from the grief he suffered after the loss of his twin brother and how much he loves Phoebe.  Sylvester is summoned and again declares himself upon which Phoebe is only too happy to accept his proposal.

Characters

Sylvester Rayne, the Duke of Salford - the 28-year-old hero; whose father died when he was 19; ducal estate is named Chance

Miss Phoebe Marlow - the 19-year-old heroine, a debutante and secret writer, whose mother died when she was less than two weeks old; raised by her father and stepmother

Mr Thomas "Tom" Orde - Phoebe's 19-year-old childhood friend, neighbour, and surrogate brother; lives at the Manor House, the only child of the local Squire and his wife, Mr and Mrs Orde

Elizabeth Rayne, Dowager Duchess of Salford - Sylvester's beloved, charming mother; a poet; an invalid, disabled by an arthritic illness and unable to walk unaided

Dowager Lady Ingham - Sylvester's godmother and Phoebe's grandmother; in her mid-60's; mother to the late Verena Marlow and a son

Lady Ianthe Rayne - widow of Sylvester's younger twin brother, Harry, who died of illness four years ago; also called "Lady Henry"; daughter of Lord and Lady Elvaston

Edmund Rayne - Lady Ianthe's six-year-old son and Sylvester's only nephew and heir; Sylvester is his sole guardian 

Sir Nugent Fotherby - a very wealthy but ridiculous and foolish dandy

Button - currently Edmund's nurse, formerly Sylvester and Harry's nurse

Lord Marlow - Phoebe's 53-year-old father, a weak, good-natured but unintelligent man famed for his excellent horsemanship in hunting circles; his country seat, Austerby, is 90 miles from London 

Lady Constance Marlow - Phoebe's unkind and critical stepmother; mother of Phoebe's half sisters, Susan (15), Mary (13), Eliza, and Kitty

Miss Sibylla "Sibby" Battery - the Marlow's gruff governess who is kind to Phoebe and her sisters; cousin to a junior partner in a publishing firm

John Keighley - Sylvester's middle-aged groom since his childhood and private friend

Major and Mrs Newbury - Sylvester's favorite cousin and her husband who live modestly in London

References 

1957 British novels
Novels by Georgette Heyer
Historical novels
Fiction set in 1817
Fiction set in 1818
Heinemann (publisher) books
Regency romance novels